John Simon Guggenheim (December 30, 1867 – November 2, 1941) was an American businessman, politician and philanthropist.

Life

Born in Philadelphia, Pennsylvania of Jewish descent, Simon Guggenheim was the son of Meyer Guggenheim and Barbara Guggenheim, and was the younger brother of Daniel Guggenheim and Solomon R. Guggenheim. He attended Central High School and the Peirce School of Business Administration before settling in Pueblo, Colorado, where he worked as the chief ore buyer for his father's mining and smelting operation, M. Guggenheim's Sons.

Guggenheim moved to Denver in 1892 and married Olga Hirsch on November 24, 1898, at the iconic Waldorf Astoria New York in Manhattan. To celebrate their marriage, the Guggenheims provided a Thanksgiving dinner to 5,000 poor Manhattan children.

He was the Republican candidate for Governor of Colorado early in the 1898 campaign but withdrew after riots broke out at the State Convention in Colorado Springs, during which one man was killed and several injured. He was a presidential elector in 1904.

Simon and Olga Guggenheim made their residence in Denver and celebrated the birth of their first child, John Simon Guggenheim, in 1905. To commemorate the event, Simon Guggenheim made an $80,000 donation to the Colorado School of Mines to build a namesake building, Simon Guggenheim Hall. At the time, it was the largest private grant ever made to a state institution.

In 1907, Olga gave birth to their second son, George Denver Guggenheim. In 1909, Simon donated a Law Building at the University of Colorado. In 1907, Simon Guggenheim was elected as a Republican to the  United States Senate, representing Colorado from 1907 to 1913. During his term in the Senate, he chaired the Committee to Establish a University of the United States, and the Committee on the Philippines. While in Congress, one of his older brothers, Benjamin Guggenheim, died in the RMS Titanic catastrophe. After his term expired, he and Olga returned to New York.

He joined the board of American Smelting and Refining Company, later becoming the board chairman. From 1919 to 1941 he was president of that company.

In 1922, Guggenheim's son John died of mastoiditis just before leaving for college. 
In his memory, Guggenheim and his wife established the John Simon Guggenheim Memorial Foundation in 1925.

In 1939, the Guggenheims' second son, George, committed suicide in a Manhattan hotel at the age of 32.

Simon Guggenheim died in 1941 and was interred in the Woodlawn Cemetery in The Bronx, New York.

See also
 Guggenheim family
 Meyer Guggenheim
 John Simon Guggenheim Memorial Foundation
 List of Jewish members of the United States Congress

References

External links

"How We Got Guggenheim Hall", Simon Guggenheim's donation and its backstory, CU Alumni Magazine, Feb. 1, 2020

1867 births
1941 deaths
20th-century American businesspeople
American people of Swiss-Jewish descent
American philanthropists
Central High School (Philadelphia) alumni
Colorado Republicans
Simon Guggenheim
Jewish American philanthropists
Jewish United States senators
New York (state) Republicans
Politicians from Philadelphia
Republican Party United States senators from Colorado
Burials at Woodlawn Cemetery (Bronx, New York)
Jewish American people in Colorado politics
1904 United States presidential electors
American businesspeople in metals